Sabulina may refer to:
 Sabulina (plant), a genus of plants in the family Caryophyllaceae
 Sabulina (foraminifera), a genus of foraminifers in the family Ataxophragmiidae
 Sabulina, a genus of gastropods in the family Achatinidae, synonym of Subulina